José Daniel Barquero Cabrero (born 13 July 1966) is a Spanish businessman and university teacher.

Career in business

Barquero was born in Barcelona, Spain, on 13 July 1966, and was raised within a business family. He started his professional career in the United States in 1988 in Boston, New York City and Washington, D.C.

Barquero worked with Edward Bernays in the creation and development of several public relations, propaganda, and political marketing campaigns. In 1991, Barquero began collaboration with British organizations alongside public relations expert Sam Black. They worked on public relations campaigns in both the United Kingdom and Spain.

Barquero then opened a consultancy, Barquero, Huertas & Llauder Associates, working for businesses, and economic, political, cultural and human rights associations and institutions.

Career in education, research and science
Barquero is an Academic of the Royal Academic of Economy and Financial Sciences of Spain and Academic of the Royal Academy of Doctors of Catalonia, Spain. He has performed in the scientific, research and faculty activities through the social, political and public relations sciences, as it can be confirmed through the ISBN data base of the Cultural Ministry of Spain, where all his research and publications can be consulted. He is considered the researcher with the most books sold in the scientific area of public relations, based on the information from the Spanish Center for Reprographic Rights CEDRO, and as it is supported by the different editorials and institutions that have promoted and published more than 30 books, such as: Deusto, McGraw Hill, Planeta, Gestión 2000, Lexnova, Grinver, Furtwangen, Libertarias, Amat Editores. Translations have been done from his books to English, Russian and Portuguese, edited and published by foreign houses such as Staffordshire University, Dielo and Porto Editora. He has been in charge of the direction and coordination of different book collections, like: “Public Relations Classics", edited by Planeta; "Collection of the Master in Public Relations and Communication in Organizations IL3-University of Barcelona" by McGraw Hill. Spanish newspapers such as "Expansión" and "Cinco Días" published, through their Management collections, Barquero investigations specialized in political marketing, public relations and communication. He has been faculty member and professor at both national and international universities, such as the University of Barcelona, Autonomous University of Barcelona, University Ramón Llull, Complutense University of Madrid, all of them in Spain; Staffordshire University and Queen's University Belfast both in the United Kingdom; University Diego Portales, University San Andrés, University Francisco de Aguirre, all of them in Chile; Moscow State University of Technologies and Management in the Russian Federation, and some others, as stated by the European Superior Council of Doctors and Honoris Causa Doctors. He has published more than 50 research articles in the areas of management, business and public relations, published by editorial groups such as "Expansión", "Buenaval" scientific journal, the Journal of the Colegio Oficial de Titulados Mercantiles y Empresariales de Barcelona, International Public Relations magazine, etc.

Academic career
He obtained his PhD at the [www.uic.es International University of Catalonia], with the research thesis: How to avoid the clash of cultures and civilizations – Multicultural Public Relations to obtain the alliance of civilizations, a thesis that was published by Spanish Editorial Libertarias  and in English by Staffordshire University in the United Kingdom, . Barquero also has several other degrees and academic honors: Executive MBA from the University of Barcelona, Expert in International Public Relations from the Universidad Complutense de Madrid, bachelor's degree in Advertising and Public Relations and bachelor's degree in Business from the University of Barcelona.

Dr. Barquero is an Academic at the Real Academia de Ciencias Económica y Financieras of Spain (RACEF). The solemn meeting, on 14 December 2009, chaired by the President of the RACEF, Hon. Dr. D. Jaime Gil Aluja, and its introducer, the Academician Hon. Dr. D. Rocafort Alfredo Nicolau. The inaugural speech was: "The clash of cultures and civilizations in the world." The inauguration took place in the Hall of Fomento del Trabajo Nacional of Barcelona, home of the Royal Academy of Economics and Finance (RACEF), by source.

Because of his career as a researcher, he has been considered one of the European pioneers in the area of social sciences in the scientific discipline of Corporate Public Relations, and he was the first to apply that discipline to Human Rights, Multiculturalism, Finance, Economics and Marketing.

Dr. Barquero became an Academic of the Royal Academy of Doctors RAD. The Solemn meeting chaired by the President of the Reial Acadèmia de Doctors, Hon. Dr. Josep Casajuana i Gibert, and its introducer, the Academician Hon. Dr. Alfredo Rocafort Nicolau. The inauguration was held on 18 February 2010 in La Lonja de Barcelona, Barcelona, Spain, according to sources. The inaugural speech was: "The Chinese economy: a new challenge for Europe."

International awards 
He is an honour member of the Harvard Business School Club in Barcelona, as stated by the European Superior Council of Doctors and Honoris Causa Doctors.

Current positions
President of the European Superior Council of Doctors and Honoris Causa Doctors
General Director of ESERP Business School
Chairman Barquero, Huertas & Llauder Associates
Director at the Institute for Long Life Learning IL3-University of Barcelona for the Master in Public Relations for Organizations

References

1966 births
Living people
Harvard Business School people
People from Barcelona
University of Barcelona alumni
Complutense University of Madrid alumni
Public relations people
20th-century Spanish businesspeople
21st-century Spanish businesspeople